Bériot or de Bériot is a French surname which may refer to: 

Charles Auguste de Bériot (1802–1870), Belgian violinist, artist and composer
Charles-Wilfrid de Bériot (1833–1914), French pianist, teacher and composer
Olivier Bériot (born 1962), French costume designer